Ancenis is a former commune in the Loire-Atlantique department in western France. On 1 January 2019, it was merged into the new commune Ancenis-Saint-Géréon. It is a former sub-prefecture of the department, and was the seat of the former arrondissement of Ancenis.

It played a great historical role as a key location on the road to Nantes (23 miles to the southwest), the historical capital of Brittany. It was named "the key of Brittany"  and the door of Brittany.

Population

Sights
Château d'Ancenis, a medieval and Renaissance castle
The Loire river on which Ancenis is located (on the north bank)
Church of Saint Peter, 15-16-17th century
Chapel of the Ursulines
Chapel Notre-Dame de Délivrance
Old quarter with mediaeval houses
Dolmen at Pierre-Couvretière

Sport
The soccer team is called RCA 44, (Racing Club D'Ancenis 44)

Personalities
Henri Ottmann, painter
Jordan Veretout, French footballer
William Louiron, footballer

Twin towns
Ancenis is twinned with the town of Kirkham, in Lancashire, UK.

See also
Communes of the Loire-Atlantique department
Hortense Clémentine Tanvet Sculptor

References

Former communes of Loire-Atlantique

Populated places disestablished in 2019